"Our Love Is Different" is a song written by Billie Holiday, R. Conway,  Basil G. Alba, and Sonny White

Recording session
Session #37: New York City, July 5, 1939, Billie Holiday & Her Orchestra, with Charlie Shavers (trumpet), Tab Smith (alto saxophone), Kenneth Hollon, Stanley Payne (tenor saxophone), Sonny White (piano), Bernard Addison (guitar), John Williams (bass), Eddie Dougherty (drums), Billie Holiday (vocals)

References

Billie Holiday songs
1939 songs
Songs written by Billie Holiday